In the United States, public sector pensions are offered at the federal, state, and local levels of government. They are available to most, but not all, public sector employees. These employer contributions to these plans typically vest after some period of time, e.g. 5 years of service. These plans may be defined-benefit or defined-contribution pension plans, but the former have been most widely used by public agencies in the U.S. throughout the late twentieth century.  Some local governments do not offer defined-benefit pensions but may offer a defined contribution plan. In many states, public employee pension plans are known as Public Employee Retirement Systems (PERS).

Pension benefits may or may not be changed after an employee is hired, depending on the state and plan, as well as hiring date, years of service, and grandfathering.

Retirement age in the public sector is usually lower than in the private sector. Public pension plan managers in the United States take higher risks investing the funds than ones outside the United States or those in the private sector.

History
Public pensions got their start with various promises, informal and legislated, made to veterans of the Revolutionary War and, more extensively, the Civil War. They were expanded greatly, and began to be offered by a number of state and local governments during the early Progressive Era in the late nineteenth century.

Federal civilian pensions were offered under the Civil Service Retirement System (CSRS), formed in 1920. CSRS provided retirement, disability and survivor benefits for most civilian employees in the federal government, until the creation of a new federal agency, the Federal Employees Retirement System (FERS), in 1987.

Federal
Federal Employees Retirement System - covers approximately 2.44 million full-time civilian employees (as of Dec 2005).

Retired pay for U.S. Armed Forces retirees is, strictly speaking, not a pension but instead is a form of retainer pay. U.S. military retirees do not vest into a retirement system while they are on active duty; eligibility for non-disability retired pay is solely based upon time in service. Unlike other retirees, U.S. military retirees are subject to involuntary recall to active duty at any time, though the likelihood of such a recall is remote, especially after age 60. In 2008, there were 1,983,467 retired military in the US. There were 856,677 receiving military pensions, the remainder carrying their longevity into federal civil service positions.

State
 
Each of the 50 US states has at least one retirement system for its employees. There are 3.68 million full-time and 1.39 million part-time state-level-government civilian employees as of 2002.

Alaska - Alaska Retirement System
Alabama - Retirement Systems of Alabama
Arizona - Arizona State Retirement System (ASRS) and Public Safety Personnel Retirement System of Arizona (PSPRS)
Arkansas - Arkansas currently has six retirement systems which cover most employees at the state and local level: Judicial Retirement, Public Employees Retirement, State Highway Employees Retirement, State Police Retirement, District Judges Retirement, and Teacher Retirement.
California - CalPERS (California Public Employees' Retirement System), CalSTRS (California State Teachers' Retirement System)
Colorado - Colorado Public Employees Retirement Association, see external homepage
Connecticut - Connecticut Teachers' Retirement Board
Delaware - Delaware Public Employees Retirement System (DPERS), see external homepage
Florida - State Board of Administration of Florida (SBA), see external SBA homepage
Georgia - Employees' Retirement System of Georgia (ERSGA, see external homepage) and Teachers Retirement System (TRS, see external homepage).
Hawaii - State of Hawaii Employees' Retirement System (ERS), see 
Iowa - Iowa Public Employees Retirement System (IPERS), see external IPERS homepage
Illinois - State Employees’ Retirement System (SERS)
Indiana - Indiana Public Retirement System (INPRS),
Kansas - Kansas Public Employees Retirement System (KPERS)
Louisiana - Louisiana State Employees' Retirement System (LASERS), see external LASERS homepage
Kentucky - Kentucky Public Pensions Authority (KPPA), see external KPPA homepage
Maine - Maine Public Employees Retirement System (MainePERS)
Massachusetts Massachusetts State Board of Retirement (Massachusetts Pension Reserves Investment Trust)
Maryland - Maryland State Retirement and Pension System (SRPS) 
Michigan - Michigan Office of Retirement Services, see external homepage
Minnesota - Public Employees Retirement Association of Minnesota, see external PERA homepage
Mississippi - PERS (Public Employees' Retirement System), which also administers the Mississippi Highway Safety Patrol Retirement System (MHSPRS), Supplemental Legislative Retirement Plan (SLRP), and Municipal Retirement Systems (MRS); see external homepage
 Missouri- Missouri State Employees Retirement System
Montana - Montana Public Employee Retirement Administration, see external MPERA homepage
Nebraska - Nebraska Public Employees Retirement Systems
Nevada - Public Employees' Retirement System of Nevada
New Hampshire - New Hampshire Retirement System
New Jersey - Public Employees’ Retirement System, Teachers’ Pension and Annunity Fund, Police and Firemens’ Retirement System, State Police Retirement System, Judicial Retirement System, Alternate Benefit Program, Defined Contribution Retirement Program, see external NJ Division of Pension and Benefits page
New Mexico - Public Employees Retirement Association of New Mexico, see external PERA homepage
New York - New York State and Local Retirement System, New York State Local Police and Fire Retirement System, New York State Teachers' Retirement System
North Carolina - North Carolina Retirement Systems (NCRS), see external North Carolina Department of State Treasurer (NCDST)
North Dakota - North Dakota Public Employees Retirement System, see 
Ohio - Ohio Public Employees Retirement System
Oklahoma - Oklahoma Public Employees Retirement System
Oregon - Oregon Public Employees Retirement System
Pennsylvania - State Employees' Retirement System and Public School Employees' Retirement System
Tennessee - Tennessee State Consolidated Retirement System
Texas - Employees Retirement System of Texas (ERS), see external ERS homepage, and Teacher Retirement System of Texas (TRS), see 
Utah - Utah Retirement Systems
Virginia - Virginia Retirement System, see external varetire.org
Washington - Washington Department of Retirement Systems, see external https://www.drs.wa.gov/
Wisconsin - Wisconsin Dept of Employee Trust Funds

Funding
Since 2001, U.S. statewide pension funds have experienced significant funding challenges due to the recessions of 2001-2002 and 2008-2009. Prior to the Dot-Com Crash, statewide pension funds were over 95.6% funded in the aggregate. In 2002, the funded ratio had declined to 82.1%. While funds did mostly recover by 2008, the Great Recession resulted in funded ratios declining to 63.8% in 2009. 

Over the following decade, funding levels improved over 2009’s all-time low, until the Covid-19 pandemic ushered in an era of unprecedented market volatility. The on-set of the pandemic resulted in funded ratios dropping back down to 71.2% in 2021, followed by a rebound to 84.5% in 2021. In 2022, market corrections resulted in the largest single-year decline since 2009, bringing the aggregate funded ratio to 77.8%. 

As of July 2022, unfunded liabilities for statewide plans totaled $1.2 trillion. Statewide retirement systems account for the bulk of unfunded liabilities in the US. State Pension plans account for approximately 88% of all unfunded liabilities of non-federal retirement systems. While national aggregates provide insight into larger trends, the funded ratio of state pension plans vary significantly by state. The extent to which unfunded liabilities impact states is relative to their overall economic output.  The size of unfunded liabilities relative to the size of a state’s GPD, provides a sense of the scale of resources that are needed to restore retirement systems to full funding. 

Illinois, Kentucky, New Jersey are significantly burdened by the funding shortfalls facing their retirement systems. Nebraska, Utah, New York and Idaho’s unfunded liabilities are equivalent to less than 1% of their respective GDPs, meaning their pension funds are well-managed and do not significantly tax their economic resources.

Local
Many U.S. cities are allowed to participate in the pension plans of their states; some of the largest have their own pension plans.  The total number of local government employees in the United States as of 2020 is 14.3 million. There are 11.1 million full-time and 3.1 million part-time local-government civilian employees as of 2020.

Local Funding
Local plans are slightly better funded than statewide plans in the US. Local plans are 78.2% funded in 2022, compared to 77.8% for statewide plans. However, the historical funding trends of municipally-managed plans are similar, if not identical to statewide plans. Locally-managed public pension plans account for approximately 12% of all unfunded liabilities of non-federal retirement systems.

Benefits
Pension benefits in the U.S. can vary widely. The pension replacement rate, or percentage of a worker's pre-retirement income that the pension replaces, varies significantly across states and benefit tiers within state retirement systems. Whether or not a worker is enrolled in social security can significantly impact how secure a public worker’s retirement is. This varies widely by state and profession. 

Pension benefits are primarily designed to favor workers who work a full career (typically at least 25 years of service), which account for approximately 24% of state-level public workers. In a study of 335 statewide retirement plans, Equable Institute found that 74.1% of pension plans in the US served this group of workers well.  

The same study found that workers with tenures of 10-25 years of service were served well by 10.9% of plans. Workers with less than 10 years of service were served well by .5% of plans. 

In another study, Equable Institute found that the total lifetime value of teacher pension benefits have declined by $100,000 on average (13%) since 2005. A teacher hired for the 2005 school year can expect to earn $768,000 in retirement benefits, where as a teacher hired for the 2023 school year can expect to earn $668,000.

See also
Political divisions of the United States
States of the United States related lists
Retirement plans in the United States
Social Security Administration

References

External links
U.S. Census Bureau page for local government
Directory of state pension executives
Public employee retirement systems
Overview of Pension Crises
Extensive Information on Federal and Postal Retirement Benefits

State Links
Alaska state retirement system
Alabama state retirement system
Arkansas Public Employees Retirement System
Arkansas Teacher Retirement System
Arkansas State Highway Employees Retirement System
Arizona State Retirement System
Arizona Public Safety Personnel Retirement System
California CalPERS
Colorado PERA
Connecticut retirement system
Delaware Office of Pensions
Kansas Public Employee Retirement System
Kentucky Public Pensions Authority
Louisiana State Employees' Retirement System
Maine Public Employees Retirement System
North Carolina Retirement Systems
Ohio Public Employee Retirement System
Tennessee Consolidated Retirement System
Utah Retirement Systems
Wisconsin Dept of Employee Trust Funds

Retirement plans in the United States
Public employment